Dicranucha homochroma is a moth in the family Gelechiidae. It was described by Anthonie Johannes Theodorus Janse in 1954. It is found in Namibia and South Africa.

The wingspan is 11–13 mm. The scales on the forewings are hair brown at the base, tipped with black. There are three small black maculae, one in the middle and one at the end of the cell, the third on the middle of the plical fold. There are a few black scales at the apical fifth of the costa and at the termen but not enough to form distinct maculae. The hindwings are glossy smoke grey, densely irrorated (sprinkled) with drab at the apical area.

References

Dicranucha
Moths described in 1954